Venusia tchraria is a moth in the family Geometridae first described by Charles Oberthür in 1893. It is found in China.

References

Moths described in 1893
Venusia (moth)